The 2015 Ontario Mine Rescue Provincial Competition were held June 10–12 at the Fort Williams Gardens Arena, in Thunder Bay, Ontario.

List of competing teams

Kirkland Lake District

AuRico Gold - Young-Davidson mine

Onaping District
Glencore - Sudbury Integrated Nickel Operations

Red Lake District
Goldcorp - Red Lake Gold Mines

Southern District

Compass Minerals - Goderich Mine

Sudbury District

Vale - West Mines

Timmins District
Dumas Contracting Limited

Thunder Bay Algoma District
Barrick Hemlo Williams Mine

List of competing technicians

Awards

References

Mining in Ontario
Ontario Mine Rescue Provincial Competition
Mining rescues